The West Linn Tidings is a weekly newspaper published in West Linn, Oregon, United States, a suburb of Portland. It is owned by the Pamplin Media Group. It was founded in 1980, and was published by the Lake Oswego Review prior to its purchase by the Pamplin group.

A 2014 Daily Beast story noted the amusing crime blotter stories in the Tidings as well as the neighboring Lake Oswego Review. As of 2017, the Tidings had a partnership with KOIN, a local television station.

See also 
 List of newspapers in Oregon

References

External links 
 
 West Linn Tidings overview at Oregon Newspaper Publishers Association website

Clackamas County, Oregon
Newspapers published by Pamplin Media Group
Oregon Newspaper Publishers Association
Newspapers established in 1981

1981 establishments in Oregon
Newspapers published in Oregon